Juan Espínola may refer to:

 Juan Espínola (musician) (fl. 20th century), Dominican merengue musician
 Juan Espínola (footballer, born 1953), Paraguayan football right-back
 Juan Espínola (footballer, born 1994), Paraguayan football goalkeeper